Laura Solon: Talking and Not Talking was a comedy sketch show created by British Perrier Award-winning comedian Laura Solon. The show was created with the BBC following her success with Kopfraper's Syndrome: One Man and His Incredible Mind and was first broadcast on BBC Radio 4. As in her previous shows, Talking and Not Talking is a compilation of a variety of short sketches featuring different recurring and one-off characters. The show was voted as the "Best British Radio Sketch Show of 2008" on the British Comedy Guide website.

The first series was broadcast between 10 January 2007 and 14 February 2007. The second series was broadcast between 28 May 2008 and 2 July 2008. The third and final series was recorded in April and May 2009 and was broadcast between 18 November 2009 and 23 December 2009.

Recurring characters
China Lion, a china ornament owned by a demented Teutonic lady. In each of its appearances, the woman describes a different way by which she came by China Lion, always involving strange circumstances. In later series, the woman interrupts various BBC events to recount tales of imaginary battles between her and her domestic staff, and particularly her nemesis, the cleaner.
Gwynneth, a hilariously inept call centre operative with a Welsh accent who always gives completely useless advice.
Divorcee Carole Price, whose unworkable business ideas, such as the cushion cover cover, fail to distract from the fact that her life is falling apart. This character also appears in the TV series Al Murray's Multiple Personality Disorder.
The Time Travelling Pride and Prejudice girls, who use a stargate in order to find husbands and often appear through fridges and other appliances.
A Russian tyrant trying to settle into modern life in the UK.
A French journalist who hates the English.

References

External links

BBC Radio comedy programmes